The Dalera, sometimes pronounced as Dalere is a Hindu  caste found in North India, and those in Uttar Pradesh have De-notified Seminomadic tribe status .

See also

 Basor

References

Social groups of Uttar Pradesh
Dalit communities